SMS G40 was a 1913 Type Large Torpedo Boat (Großes Torpedoboot) of the Imperial German Navy (Deutschen Kaiserliche Marine) during World War I, and the 16th ship of her class.

Construction

Built by Germaniawerft in Kiel, Germany, she was launched in February 1915.

Service
G40 was assigned to the First Torpedo Boat Flotilla of the High Seas Fleet of the German Imperial Navy.  When she participated in the Battle of Jutland she was assigned to escort the battlecruiser SMS Lützow.  In this action, Lützow was severely damaged such that she was unable to return to German waters.  She assisted SMS G37, SMS G38 and SMS V45 in the evacuation of survivors.  Naval gunfire from pursuing British vessels subsequently damaged G40'''s engines and she had to be towed back to German waters.

After the end of hostilities, G40 was interned at Scapa Flow and scuttled.  She was salvaged for scrap by Ernest Cox in 1925.

References
  Technical specs of the Großes Torpedoboot 1913 class''

Torpedo boats of the Imperial German Navy
1915 ships
Ships built in Kiel
World War I torpedo boats of Germany
World War I warships scuttled at Scapa Flow
Maritime incidents in 1919